{{Infobox recurring event
| name         = Milford Writer's Workshop (or more properly Milford Writers' Conference)
| logo         = 
| logo_alt     =
| logo_caption = 
| logo_size    =
| image        = 
| image_size   =
| alt          =
| caption      = 
| status       = Active
| genre        = Conference
| date         = 
| begins       = 
| ends         = 
| frequency    = Annually
| venue        = Various
| location     =  Milford, Pennsylvania, United States (before 1972) Various locations, United Kingdom (1972–2019, 2021–)
| coordinates  =  
| country      = 
| years_active = 
| first        = 1950s
| founder_name = Damon Knight, among others
| last         = 
| prev         = 2019
| next         = 2021
| participants = Science fiction writers
| attendance   = 
| capacity     =
| area         = 
| budget       = 
| activity     = Writers' workshop
| leader_name  =
| patron       = 
| organised    = 
| filing       = 
| people       = 
| member       = 
| sponsor      = 
| website      = 
}}
The Milford Writer's Workshop, or more properly Milford Writers' Conference', is an annual science fiction writer's event founded by Damon Knight, among others, in the mid-1950s, in Milford, Pennsylvania. It was so named because Knight, Judith Merril, and James Blish lived in Milford when it was founded. It moved to the United Kingdom in 1972 and has run successfully ever since on an annual basis.

Description
Judith Merril, James Blish, and Damon Knight founded the Milford Writer's Conference in 1956. It is both a residential workshop and a writers' conference in which published science fiction writers convene over the course of a week to intensively critique stories and samples from novels (usually works in progress) and to workshop ideas on all aspects of SF writing. It is a peer-to-peer conference with no teachers or students.

Milford and related entities like Science Fiction Forum'' presaged the creation of the Science Fiction Writers of America in 1965 and that decade's New Wave movement. In 1972, Blish set up the United Kingdom Milford SF Writers' Conference, which initially met in Milford on Sea, Hampshire. Since then it has been held in various locations, latterly Devon until 2001, York in 2002 and 2003, and (since 2004) at Trigonos Conference Centre in North Wales, usually in mid September.

The conference went on hiatus in 2020, due to the Coronavirus lockdown.

Honorary committee
An honorary committee is elected annually at the AGM held during the Milford week. The 2015 committee (elected 2014) comprised: Sue Thomason (Chair), Liz Williams (Secretary), Tina Anghelatos (Treasurer), Jacey Bedford (Vice-Chair, Website and Mailing Lists), Kari Sperring, and Karen Williams. Committee members are listed on the workshop's official web site.

Participants
Participants must have sold at least one science fiction story to qualify for attendance, and relative newcomers to publication are welcomed, though participants often have multiple novel and/or short story sales to their credit. Qualification details are quoted on the workshop's official website.

Workshop participants in the United States (pre-1972) included:

 James Blish
 Anthony Boucher
 John Brunner
 Dorris Pitkin Buck
 Algis Budrys
 Jack Dann
 Avram Davidson
 Lester Del Rey
 Samuel R. Delany
 Thomas M. Disch
 Gardner Dozois
 George Alec Effinger
 Harlan Ellison
 Carol Emshwiller
 Ed Emshwiller
 Harry Harrison
 Gustav Hasford
 Cyril Kornbluth
 Keith Laumer
 Ursula K. Le Guin
 Katherine MacLean
 Anne McCaffrey
 Richard McKenna
 Judith Merril
 Frederik Pohl
 Jane Roberts
 Joanna Russ
 James Sallis
 Robert Silverberg
 Ted Sturgeon
 Kurt Vonnegut
 Gene Wolfe

Milford is the model for other peer-to-peer science fiction writer workshops, including the Turkey City Writer's Workshop, the Clarion Workshop and the Clarion West Writers Workshop. 

Participants in the UK (in 1972 and afterward) have included:

 Tom Arden
 Jacey Bedford
 John Brunner
 John Clute
 Jaine Fenn
 Neil Gaiman
 Mary Gentle
 John Grant
 Colin Greenland
 Ben Jeapes
 Diana Wynne Jones
 Gwyneth Jones
 David Langford
 George R. R. Martin
 Anne McCaffrey
 Naomi Mitchison
 Alastair Reynolds
 Kari Sperring
 Bruce Sterling
 Charles Stross
 Karen Traviss
 Liz Williams
 Patricia Wrede

A full list of former Milford participants is listed on the workshop's official website.

Milford rules 
Manuscripts are distributed beforehand. Everyone reads, critiques, and prepares before the formal workshop begins. Etiquette precludes participants from discussing the manuscripts beforehand either with the author or other members of the critique group. The participants sit in a circle. The author whose work is being critiqued must sit in silence through the first part, in which each participant in turn is allowed an uninterrupted four minutes (timed) to deliver their critique. Then the author has an uninterrupted right to reply. Following that a general discussion ensues. Constructive criticism is strongly encouraged. In the last few years it has become acceptable for the critiqued manuscripts to be given back to the author, complete with notes.

This so-called "Milford method" has been adopted by several writers' groups, including the Glasgow Science Fiction Writers Circle.

See also

 List of writers' conferences

References

External links
 , the workshop's official website
 , the official website of the Trigonos Conference Centre

Year of establishment missing
1950s establishments in Pennsylvania
Annual events in Pennsylvania
Annual events in the United Kingdom
Arts organizations established in the 1950s
Creative writing programs
Pike County, Pennsylvania
Science fiction organizations
Speculative fiction writing circles
Writers' conferences